Tom Cross is an American television and film editor.

He is known for his collaborations with Damien Chazelle including Whiplash (2014) for which he won the Academy Award for Best Film Editing as well as La La Land (2016), and First Man (2018). He is also known for his work on David O. Russell's Joy (2015), the musical The Greatest Showman (2016), Scott Cooper's Hostiles (2017), and Cary Joji Fukunaga's No Time to Die (2021).

Career 
He began his career in 1997 as an assistant editor, contributing to such diverse projects as We Own the Night (2007), Crazy Heart (2009), The Switch (2010) and the Primetime Emmy Award-winning drama series Deadwood. He came to worldwide prominence in 2015 when he won the Independent Spirit Award for Best Editing, BAFTA Award for Best Editing, and Academy Award for Best Editing (among other honors) for his work on the acclaimed film Whiplash (2014). and reunited with writer/director Damien Chazelle on the musical romantic comedy La La Land (2016).

Influences  
He has cited The Wild Bunch (1969) and The French Connection (1971) as influences.

Personal life 
He is the son of Lah and Jim Cross. His mother is from Vietnam.

Filmography

Awards and nominations

See also 
 Asian Americans in arts and entertainment
 List of Asian Academy Award winners and nominees

References

External links
 

Living people
American film editors
American people of Vietnamese descent
Year of birth missing (living people)
Best Editing BAFTA Award winners
Best Film Editing Academy Award winners
Independent Spirit Award winners